Albert Jourda (14 January 1893 – 23 December 1961) was a French international footballer who played as a midfielder.

Career 
Jourda was born in 1893 in Paris.

He played most of his career for Club Français and Sète. With Club Français, he played on the team that won the 1918 edition of the Challenge de la Renommée, a competition held during World War I. With Sète, he played in back-to-back Coupe de France finals. The club lost both matches; 4–2 to Red Star Olympique in 1923 and 3–2 against Marseille in 1924. 

Jourda was also a France international. He played in seven matches with the team. He was part of the French squad for the football tournament at the 1924 Summer Olympics, but he did not play in any matches.

References

External links
 

1893 births
1961 deaths
Association football midfielders
French footballers
France international footballers
FC Sète 34 players
Club Français players
Red Star F.C. players
Racing Club de France Football players
Footballers at the 1924 Summer Olympics
Olympic footballers of France